Saeki may refer to:

Places 

 Saeki, Okayama, a former town in Wake District, Okayama, Japan
 Saeki District, Hiroshima, a former district in Hiroshima, Japan
 Saeki-ku, Hiroshima, a ward of the city of Hiroshima, Japan

Other uses 
 Saeki (surname), a Japanese surname
 Saeki people of ancient Japan